Frank J. Gigliotti (October 30, 1942August 7, 2011) was an American construction worker-turned-politician in Pennsylvania.  He was convicted of bribery and extortion in 2000, and was released from prison in 2003.

Personal life
Frank J. Gigliotti was born on October 30, 1942 in Pittsburgh, Pennsylvania.  His siblings were Theresa, Anthony, and Michael.  He graduated South Hills Catholic High School in 1969, and attended Carnegie Mellon Managerial School.  In 1997, Gigliotti separated from his wife and mother of his three children (Christina, Regina, and Frank Jr.); as of January 25, 2000, he was not married.  Gigliotti moved to West Melbourne, Florida in 2003, and died in that state from complications of diabetes on August 7, 2011.

Career
Before even graduating high school, Gigliotti operated a backhoe in the construction industry from 1969–1975.

Civil service
In 1975, Gigliotti was hired by the Pittsburgh Public Works Department.  In 1977, when he helped elect Richard Caliguiri as mayor of Pittsburgh, he collected significant political cachet that propelled him into intradepartmental promotions and eventually the chairmanship of the city's 19th Ward (South Hills) from 1983–1989.

Succeeding Steve Seventy on January 3, 1989, Gigliotti was first seated as a representative for the Pennsylvania House of Representatives, District 22.  Nominated by Representative Anthony Colaizzo, Gigliotti was appointed as the house teller on the same day.  During his tenure in the Pennsylvania House, Gigliotti was a powerful politician who failed to legalize riverboat gambling.  In 1997, he was a straw donor for Bob O'Connor's mayoral campaign before "realizing that was illegal."  A Democrat, he was still representing District 22 upon his resignation of June 15, 2000.

Extortion
From 1996–1998, Schneider Engineering Technologies was contracted with the Allegheny County Sanitary Authority (Alcosan).  During those years, Gigliotti extorted Disney World tickets and airfare from Frank Schneider, saying that otherwise he would influence the Alcosan board against Schneider's interests.

In 1998, Gigliotti was bribed by Ernest Smalis, a Shadyside bridge painter under government contract. In exchange for cash and a paid trip to Disney World, Gigliotti applied his influence to the Alcosan board and other state government agencies. He failed to reach an identical agreement with Mascaro Inc. the very next day.

Prosecution
In December 1999, a federal grand jury handed down a 27-count indictment for soliciting and accepting bribes from government contractors.

As part of a plea bargain, Gigliotti pled guilty to extortion, mail fraud and filing a false income tax return in April 2000. Prosecutors recommended 30–37 months imprisonment. At Gigliotti's request, Representatives W. Curtis Thomas and Edward P. Wojnaroski Sr. wrote to Judge Gustave Diamond to speak of Gigliotti's "honesty and integrity" and to call him a "fine character", respectively; they were joined in this effort by former Pennsylvania representatives Christopher K. McNally and Greg Fajt.

Post-incarceration
Released from a West Virginia prison in mid-July 2002 as part of a work release program, Gigliotti was hired by Alco Parking Co.—Pittsburgh's "largest operator of [parking] lots and garages"—through his family connections. He was expected to complete the program in January 2003.

References

1942 births
2011 deaths
American people convicted of tax crimes
construction trades workers
deaths from diabetes
members of the Pennsylvania House of Representatives
Pennsylvania Democrats
Pennsylvania politicians convicted of crimes
politicians convicted of extortion under color of official right
politicians from Pittsburgh